Avedik (in Armenian Աւետիք) is a Lebanese-Armenian publication published by the Armenian Catholic Patriarchate in Lebanon and the official organ of the Armenian Catholic Church worldwide.

Licensed as a monthly publication, the religious Armenian-Catholic publication is now published with varying frequencies (monthly, bi-monthly, quarterly, semi-annually, annually) as a small-size periodical.

See also
 Massis (periodical)

External links
Avedik periodical archive (PDF pages)

Armenian-language magazines
Armenian-language mass media in Lebanon
Armenian Catholic Church
Catholic magazines
Irregularly published magazines
Magazines published in Beirut
Magazines with year of establishment missing
Monthly magazines published in Lebanon